Broder Daniel (Swedish for Brother Daniel), often abbreviated as BD, was an alternative rock band from Gothenburg, Sweden. They formed in the late 1980s and then consisted of classmates Henrik Berggren and Daniel Gilbert. The band claims they started playing "to gain social respect" and it was decided early on that emotional expression would be more important to their sound than musical correctness.

Musically, they were inspired by bands such as The Jesus and Mary Chain and The Velvet Underground, relying heavily on distorted guitars and simple arrangements. Their lyrics have mostly centered on existential issues and youth angst.

Broder Daniel was largely regarded as a cornerstone of Swedish alternative music during the 1990s, even though the band has proven to be quite unstable ever since the beginning, with members leaving the band every few years. Their song "Shoreline" is considered a modern classic in Sweden, with the phrase "spela 'Shoreline'" ("play 'Shoreline'" in Swedish) commonly referenced in public. A monument to the band with a "Spela Shoreline" plaque existed in Gothenburg from 2014 to 2018.

The band broke up in 2008 following the suicide of guitarist Anders Göthberg, performing their final concert later that year at Gothenburg's Way Out West festival in his memory.

History
While attending Göteborgs Högre Samskola in Gothenburg, Henrik Berggren was looking for a way to express himself, and decided that the easiest way would be to form a pop band. The first six years of the band's existence consisted of a number of name changes until the band finally settled on the name Broder Daniel - translating to Brother Daniel. A couple of new members joined and they slowly started to find their sound. Swedish music press soon caught on to the hype of the now notorious band featuring charismatic singer Henrik who in a short time had gained a cult following of maladjusted youth, looking for a leader. Journalists, however, tended to mostly focus on the violent shows and Henrik's make-up and out of tune voice.

Music label Jimmy Fun Music, owned by Roxette member Per Gessle, picked the band up and promoted them until they signed to EMI Music Sweden. In 1995 the band released their debut album Saturday Night Engine which was characterized by its simple songs with relatively low respect for musical correctness. They soon gained a relatively large following of fans throughout Sweden.

After releasing their second album, self-titled Broder Daniel, the band resigned from EMI in 1997 and found themselves without a record deal - something few people in the music industry could understand. While they did not sell many records, the band was indeed a popular act in clubs and on music festivals. One year later they signed to record label Dolores Recordings and released their most critically acclaimed album so far: Broder Daniel Forever. The new record was dark, with a focus on topics of love and death. Its sound was inspired by Psychocandy, the debut album of indie rockers The Jesus and Mary Chain. The popularity of Forever soon took off, and the band reached a larger audience than ever before in their career, much thanks to the inclusion of three Broder Daniel songs on the soundtrack for the movie Show Me Love which was one of the most popular films in Sweden in the 1990s.

Following the release of Forever, the band embarked on a controversial tour across Sweden, which the band later ended prematurely. A few shows were played in England as an attempt to sign a record deal for international release of their albums. That, however, didn't succeed. After the tour, the members parted ways to recover and did not maintain any contact with each other in the year that followed. In 2001, bass player Håkan Hellström released a solo record which hit big and soon after that he left the band, since the other members didn't think his reputation as a spreader of joy would reflect well on the band. Guitar player Theodor Jensen also released a celebrated record with his band The Plan.

Five years after the release of Forever, the band once again got together to record their new album Cruel Town which was released in 2003. This time around they had a clear focus on the lyrics which were now more complex and less repetitive than before. This album showed a matured Broder Daniel, with themes based around society and nostalgia. Berggren was now singing about the cold society which had made him the person he is today, while looking back at his childhood.

Since the Cruel Town tour, the band has performed only a few times together. Singer Henrik Berggren has performed several acoustic solo sets playing Broder Daniel-songs.

On 30 March 2008, guitarist Anders Göthberg committed suicide in Stockholm by jumping off the Västerbron bridge.

The band played together for the last time at Way Out West Festival in Gothenburg in honour of the late Anders Göthberg. During the concert they played their newly written song "Hold On to Your Dreams", dedicated to Göthberg. In August 2014, a memorial to the band was raised at the site of their last concert in Slottsskogen.

Members
 Henrik Berggren – singer
 Lars Malmros – drums
 Anders Göthberg – electric guitar (died in 2008)
 Theodor Jensen – bass guitar and electric guitar (left in 2003, rejoined in 2005)
 Daniel Gilbert – bass guitar (left in 1995)
 Johan Neckvall – electric guitar (left in 1997)
 Håkan Hellström – bass guitar and drums (played drums until his departure in 1994, rejoined as bass guitar player in 1998, left again in 2002)

Timeline

Discography

Albums 
 Saturday Night Engine, 1995
 Broder Daniel, 1996
 Broder Daniel Forever, 1998
 Singles, 2000
 Cruel Town, 2003
 No Time For Us (1989–2004), 2005
 The Demos 1989-1997, 2005

Singles/maxisingles
1995 - Cadillac
1995 - Luke Skywalker
1995 - Iceage
1996 - Go my own way
1996 - Work
1998 - I'll be Gone
1998 - You bury me
1998 - Fucking Åmål theme: Underground
1998 - Fucking Åmål theme: Whirlwind
1999 - Happy People Never Fantasize
2003 - When We Were Winning
2003 - Cruel Town. Promo, snippet
2004 - Shoreline
2004 - What Clowns Are We
2005 - Luke Skywalker 7"

DVD
2004 - Army of Dreamers

Film
2009 - Broder Daniel Forever

References

External links 
  Official website
 
 

Musical groups established in 1989
Musical groups disestablished in 2008
Musical groups from Gothenburg
Swedish indie pop groups
Swedish indie rock groups